The Fiat Ducato is a light commercial vehicle jointly developed by FCA Italy and PSA Group (currently Stellantis), and mainly manufactured by Sevel, a joint venture between the two companies since 1981. It has also been sold as the Citroën C25, Peugeot J5, Alfa Romeo AR6 and Talbot Express and later as the Fiat Ducato, Citroën Jumper (Relay in the United Kingdom), and Peugeot Boxer, from 1994 onwards. It entered the North American market as the Ram ProMaster in May 2014 for the 2015 model year.

In Europe, it is produced at the Sevel Sud factory, in Atessa, Italy. It has also been produced at the Iveco factory in Sete Lagoas, Brazil, at the Karsan factory in Akçalar, Turkey, at the Fiat Chrysler Automobiles Saltillo Van Assembly Plant in Saltillo, Mexico, and at the Fiat-Sollers factory in Elabuga, Russia. Since 1981, more than 2.6 million Fiat Ducatos have been produced. The name "Ducato" is a reference to the ducat; after the Fiorino, this was the second Fiat light commercial vehicle to be named after ancient coinage.

In July 2019, the electric version of the Ducato developed by FCA Italy was presented and will be on sale from 2020. From the model year of 2021, the Ducato is also rebadged as the Opel/Vauxhall Movano, replacing the previous model Movano, which from 1998 until 2021 had been based on the Renault Master.

The Ducato is the most common motorhome base used in Europe; with around two thirds of motorhomes using the Ducato base.

First generation (1981)

The Ducato was first launched in 1981, and was the result of Fiat's collaboration with PSA Peugeot Citroën, that resulted in the vehicle's development starting in 1978. The vehicles were manufactured at the Sevel Val di Sangro plant in Atessa, central Italy, and at the Sevel Campania plant in Pomigliano d'Arco, Naples together with the similar Alfa Romeo AR6, Citroën C25 and Peugeot J5 versions. The Peugeot J5 was sold as the Talbot Express in the United Kingdom (1986–1994). The collaboration of Fiat and PSA had earlier produced the Fiat 242 and Citroën C35 from 1974.

For the Fiat, engines were 2.0 litre 4-cylinder petrol or 1.9 diesel. Trim levels were base, S and SX. Model variants were named according to carrying capacity: Ducato 10 (1.0 tons), Ducato 13 (1.3 tons), Ducato 14 (1.4 tons) and Ducato Maxi 18 (1.8 tons). The Ducato Mk1 was very popular as a basis for campervan conversions. A short-wheelbase version was sold as Fiat Talento.

In August 1992 some Fiat Ducato were built with the T29C electric DC motor from Leroy-Somer, named as the Ducato Elettra powered by 28 Valve-Regulated-Lead-Acid batteries VRLA battery GEL cell batteries 6 V 160 A (168 V DC), in a wooden box (868 kg). This 4765 x 1965 x 2100 mm transporter (valid maximum weight 3190 kg) had a vehicle payload of 750 kg and a range up to 70 kilometers.

Fiat Talento
The Fiat Talento (Italian pronunciation: [taˈlɛnto]) is a light commercial vehicle produced by the Italian automaker Fiat, first sold in 1981 as a short wheelbase version of the Ducato. It has been offered in two non-consecutive generations, as the nameplate made its return as a rebadged Renault Trafic (X82) in 2016. In 1994, The first generation Talento was discontinued. The name continues Fiat's practice of naming their commercial vehicles after old currencies, with "talento" referring to the talent, a unit of measurement often used for precious metals.

Alfa Romeo AR6

The Alfa Romeo AR6 was a badge engineered Ducato sold by Alfa Romeo on the Italian market only, as a replacement for the Alfa Romeo Romeo. It was available in two different wheelbase lengths, and as a passenger van, commercial van or pick-up truck. It was also the final commercial vehicle sold by Alfa Romeo. The Alfa Romeo brand model was produced in the Sevel Campania plant (former ARVECO – Alfa Romeo Industrial Vehicles) of Pomigliano d'Arco, Naples until 1 January 1986 when Alfa Romeo dropped out of the commercial vehicle business entirely. Production of the Fiat Ducato continued in the same plant until 1994 when it was closed.

Citroën C25
The Citroën C25 was a 2.5 tonne capacity van (hence the name C25) produced from October 1981 until 1993. The C25 succeeded the dated corrugated Citroën Type H post war one tonne van. The C25's engines are transversely mounted; the petrol one is a Peugeot 504 unit whilst the diesel one is from the Citroën CX diesel. Both units are coupled to a Citroën gearbox.

In February 1982, the range was extended to include a pick-up truck and a minibus. In 1991, the C25 series 2 was launched with an enlarged grille. In 1994, the C25 was replaced by the Jumper.

Peugeot J5

The Peugeot J5 was a 2.5 tonne capacity van, also produced from October 1981 until 1993. Its powertrains are as per the Citroën C25. In 1991, the J5 series 2 was launched with a new front grille and headlights. It was replaced in 1994 by the Peugeot Boxer, which was based on the second generation Fiat Ducato.

It sold reasonably well in France but enjoyed little commercial success outside France, being overshadowed in much of Europe by the Fiat Ducato, which was supported by stronger commercial vehicle dealership networks in key markets.

Talbot Express

The Talbot Express van, sold solely in the United Kingdom, was the last Talbot-badged motor vehicle to be produced, quietly succeding the outdated Dodge Spacevan modeline. Production of this badge-engineered version for the United Kingdom began in 1982 and continued until 1994, nearly eight years after the last Talbot badged passenger car had been withdrawn.

Its Citroën/Peugeot petrol and diesel engines were transversely mounted driving the front wheels. A 4x4 option was also available, although is now very rare today.

In 1991, the series 2 Express was launched with an enlarged grille. Production was discontinued in 1994, when Peugeot finally discarded the Talbot marque.

This van was popular in the United Kingdom, for new conversions to camper vans or motorhomes by coach builders. Provided they are well-maintained and not too rusty, they can still command prices of many thousands of pounds even though they are over twenty years old. This is in marked contrast to the values of the commercial van versions.

Engines

Second generation (1993)

The second generation Ducato arrived in 1993 and was still produced by Sevel. Peugeot changed the name from J5 to Boxer while Citroën rebranded the C25 as Jumper (sold as the "Relay" in the United Kingdom and Ireland). One engine option was a Fiat 2.5 L diesel, which was replaced with 2.8 L Iveco/Sofim engine in 1998.

The Ducato Goods Transport has a payload of 12 m³ and comes with a choice of four engines: the 2.0 petrol, 2.0 JTD, 2.3 JTD 16v or 2.8 JTD. All of these conformed to the Euro 3 standards and offered programmed maintenance management. The range included two types of gearbox: a mechanical box with a five-speed manual plus reverse and an automatic transmission with four speeds plus reverse.

The Ducato Passenger Transport has a carrying capacity of six to nine people and comes with the 2.3 litre JTD 16v engine, which again is Euro 3 compliant and delivers 110 bhp.

The Ducato Combi is a mixture of the Goods Transport and the Passenger Transport. It is ideal for the transport of people and goods alike, and it can accommodate up to nine occupants. Model designations were Ducato 10 (1 ton), Ducato 14 (1.4 tons) and Ducato Maxi 18 (1.8 tons).

2002 facelift

The second series was restyled in February 2002, with the addition of rear and side bump mouldings and revised front grille. The engine range was: 2.0 JTD, 2.3 JTD 16v and 2.8 JTD, 2.5 diesel was dropped. Model designations were changed to reflect maximum gross weight: Ducato 29 (2.9 tons), Ducato 30 (3.0 tons), Ducato 33 (3.3 tons) and Ducato Maxi 35 (3.5 tons).

On 15 December 2005, the three millionth vehicle was produced, which resulted in the rate of production increasing to nine vehicles per day. This generation is also produced at the Fiat Auto Poland Tychy plant in complete knock down, at the Iveco plant in Sete Lagoas (Brazil), at the Karsan plant in Alkaçar, Turkey since 2000, and since 2006 in Elabuga, Russia (Fiat-Sollers).

The Ducato, Jumper and Boxer have been produced in Brazil until December 2016.

Engines

1993–1999

 Only for Fiat Ducato
 Only for Citroën Jumper and Peugeot Boxer

2000–2001

 Only for Citroën Jumper and Peugeot Boxer
 Only for Fiat Ducato

2002–2006

 Only for Citroën Jumper and Peugeot Boxer
 Only for Fiat Ducato

Third generation (2006)

The third generation Jumper/Relay was launched in September 2006 as a 2007 model, followed by the Boxer in June and the Ducato later as a 2008 model. The vehicle was available in many variants both for people and goods transport. Weights were again increased, with the following designations for all-up weight: Ducato 30 (3 tonnes), Ducato 33 (3.3 tonnes), Ducato Maxi 35 (3.5 tonnes) and Ducato Maxi 40 (4 tonnes).  In van configuration, the vehicle is available in three wheelbases: 3000 mm (118 inch), 3450 mm (136 inch), and 4050 mm (159 inch), and in three heights: 2250 mm (90 inch), 2500 mm (99 inch), and 2750 mm (109 inch).  Also in van configuration, the three wheelbases are offered in four overall vehicle lengths of 4950 mm (195 inch), 5400 mm (213 inch), 6000 mm (236 inch), and 6350 mm (250 inch).  The two longest body lengths are available only with the 4050 mm wheelbase.

Mexico
This third generation Ducato has been available in Mexico since November 2007, and over 30 different models are available. It is marketed as the Fiat Ducato, and as the Peugeot Manager. These models are similar to the European configurations with smaller engines, available diesel, and manual transmissions, although the Canada and US version, with larger gasoline engines and automatic transmissions is made in Mexico.

Ram ProMaster
Since October 2013 Fiat Chrysler Automobiles's Ram Trucks brand has marketed the Ducato as the Ram ProMaster in Canada and the US. Since the 2009 bankruptcy of Chrysler and subsequent acquisition by Fiat, Chrysler had not offered a large van in this market. Dodge Trucks (the brand name used by Chrysler prior to the inception of the Ram brand) had offered a version of the Mercedes-Benz Sprinter van between 2003–2009, and earlier the Dodge Ram Van. The ProMaster is produced in FCA's Saltillo, Mexico plant.

Traditional commercial vans in this market are heavy body-on-frame based on pickup trucks. The ProMaster has a unibody construction and front-wheel drive. This gives it a lower floor height, which improves cargo loading. Front-wheel drive also improves handling and safety.

The most significant difference between the ProMaster and the Ducato is the availability of a 3.6 L 24 valve V6 gasoline Chrysler Pentastar engine offered in conjunction with the Chrysler 62TE six speed automatic transmission as standard equipment. The Iveco 3.0 L 16-valve I4 diesel JTD engine, branded as EcoDiesel by Chrysler, mated with the M40 six speed automated manual transmission was offered in model years 2014 through 2016; however, the gasoline V6 is currently the sole engine available in the ProMaster. Starting in the 2021 model year, the standard engine is the 3.6 L 24 valve V6 gasoline Pentastar Upgrade engine, in cojunction with the 9-speed ZF 9HP48 automatic replacing the Chrysler 62TE Transmission.

The ProMaster is offered in three wheelbases, four overall body lengths (with the two longest body lengths available only with the  wheelbase).  Only the low ( and medium ) heights are offered on the ProMaster.

The window van is available only in the  wheelbase and  roof height.

For the 2019 model year, the ProMaster received a new front fascia, replacing the crosshair grille with a new "RAM"-lettered front grille. The 3.0L EcoDiesel inline four-cylinder (I4) turbodiesel engine was also discontinued, leaving the 3.6L Pentastar V6 gasoline engine with variable valve timing (VVT) as the only engine choice for the ProMaster. The previously-optional five-inch Uconnect 3 touchscreen radio was made standard equipment to comply with the Federal Motor Vehicle Safety Standards (FMVSS) requiring that all vehicles with GVWR of 10,000 lb (4535 Kg) or less manufactured after April 2018 provide a rearview camera.

At the 2020 Work Truck Show in Indianapolis, Indiana, Ram introduced the 2021 model year ProMaster with new features. A 9.2-inch digital rearview mirror with a rear camera is available as an option. New safety features include blind spot monitoring (BLIS) with rear cross-path detection and a forward collision warning system (FCWS) with emergency brake assist. LED interior lighting for the interior courtesy and ambient interior lighting is also available.

For the 2023 model year, the Ram ProMaster received a second facelift to match the styling of the other post-facelift models.

Engines

2007–2010

 Only for Fiat Ducato
 Only for Citroën Jumper and Peugeot Boxer

2010–2014

 Only for Citroën Jumper and Peugeot Boxer
 Only for Fiat Ducato
 Only for Ram ProMaster

Note: for some versions/markets the previous engines are still available.

Notes

Facelift (2014–present)
The fourth generation Ducato/Jumper/Relay/Boxer (platform designation X290) was introduced in the summer of 2014, scheduled for an October 2014 debut as a 2015 model while the 2014 model year was entirely skipped. Although based on the third generation model, it features a heavily revised front end, with more car like headlight styling. Euro 6 engines were introduced for the 2017 model year in late 2016, and does not require Adblue (Fiat version only) unlike most of its competitors. The Ram ProMaster was revised in 2018 for the 2019 model year with a different grille, increased payload and improved towing capacity.

In 2021, new features include adaptive cruise control, autonomous emergency braking and lane keep assist. In the same year, following the acquisition of Opel and Vaxuhall by Groupe PSA and its subsequent merger with FCA to form Stellantis, the Ducato was rebadged as the Opel/Vauxhall Movano, which was previously based on the Renault Master.

In 2022, the Ducato and ProMaster received a redesigned dashboard and the 948TE nine-speed automatic transmission as standard equipment for the ProMaster and optional for the Ducato. The Ducato also receives the 2.2L turbo diesel used by its PSA counterparts, branded as the Multijet 3, while the ProMaster receives a revised 3.6L Pentastar. For the 2023 model year, the front end of the ProMaster is redesigned to match its European counterparts, coinciding with the introduction of the ProMaster EV; the van also receives a third "super-high" roof option on the longest wheelbase. 

Toyota Motor Europe and Stellantis plan to build a Toyota-badged large van based on the Ducato platform, expected to be released in mid-2024. This is an expansion of the two automakers' LCV partnership started in 2012.

E-Ducato
The battery electric Ducato Electric was announced in July 2019, with planned availability in 2020.

In April 2021, Fiat launched the E-Ducato, which had been co-developed with package delivery firm DHL. Ducato gliders are assembled at the Fiat Sevel Sud factory in Atessa, then shipped to Fiat Mirafiori in Turin, where they are fitted with a drivetrain developed by SolarEdge. Estimated maximum production capacity is 1,000 vehicles per month. The similar electric van variants sold by PSA as the Citroen Jumper/Relay and Peugeot Boxer also are assembled at Sevel Sud, but use a different battery technology as they are converted by BD Auto instead.

The E-Ducato is fitted with either a 3- or 5-module high voltage traction battery with 47 or 79 kW-hr of storage, respectively; estimated range is  under the WLTP mixed cycle for the larger battery. As an option, the E-Ducato can be fitted with a port to accept power at up to 50 kW (DC).

Sales and production figures

Ram ProMaster sales

References

External links

 
 Fiat Ducato Owner's Manual (3rd generation)

Ducato
Vans
Minibuses
Vehicles introduced in 1981
1980s cars
1990s cars
2000s cars
2010s cars
Front-wheel-drive vehicles
Cars of Brazil